This list of mines in Egypt is subsidiary to the list of mines article and lists working, defunct and future mines in the country and is organised by the primary mineral output. For practical purposes stone, marble and other quarries may be included in this list.

Coal mines
El Maghara mine
Gold mines
Sukari mine
Phosphate mines
Abu Tartur mine
Tantalum mines
Abu Dabab mine
El Nuweiba mine
Umm Naggat mine

Egypt
Mines